Laura Jean Ahrens (born August 9, 1962) is an American prelate who currently serves as the Suffragan Bishop of Connecticut.

Education
Ahrens studied at Princeton University and graduated with a Bachelor of Arts in geology and geophysics in 1984. She then studied at the Berkeley Divinity School, where she earned her Master of Divinity in 1991. She also holds a Doctor of Ministry from Hartford Seminary, which she was awarded in 2000. She graduated with her doctoral thesis titled Engaging a Generation, Adult Education for Baby Boomers.

Ordained Ministry
Ahrens was ordained deacon in 1991 and priest in 1992. She spent her diaconate and the first year of her priesthood as curate of St Peter's Church in Osterville, Massachusetts. In 1992, she became associate rector of Trinity Church in Concord, Massachusetts, while in 1995 she then became associate rector of St Luke's Church in Darien, Connecticut. Between 2000 and 2007, she served as rector of St James' Church in Danbury, Connecticut.

Bishop
On March 10, 2007, Ahrens was elected on the fifth ballot as Suffragan Bishop of Connecticut at a special convention held in Christ Church Cathedral, Hartford. She was consecrated on June 30, 2007, in the Woolsey Hall of Yale University, by Presiding Bishop Katharine Jefferts Schori.

See also
 List of Episcopal bishops of the United States
 Historical list of the Episcopal bishops of the United States

References

Further reading 

 

Living people
American Episcopalians
Princeton University alumni
Women Anglican bishops
Episcopal Church in Connecticut
Christians from Connecticut
1962 births
Episcopal bishops of Connecticut